

Legality of Statutory Schemes 
 Immigration and Naturalization Service v. Chadha (1983) - Congress may not reserve a "legislative veto" over delegated authority.
 Commodity Futures Trading Commission v. Schor (1986) - Delegation of judicial power to an agency.
 Morrison v. Olson (1988) - Congressional control over executive branch limitations.
 Gade v. National Solid Wastes Management Association (1992) - Ways in which Federal law preempts state law.
 Printz v. United States (1997) - Federal Government may not "commandeer" state executive or administrative officials.
 Whitman v. American Trucking Associations, Inc. (2001) - delegation of legislative-like authority must be governed by an "intelligible principle."

Appropriate Deference to Agency 
 Skidmore v. Swift & Co. (1944) - deference to agency "rules" and interpretations not intended by Congress to carry the "force of law."
 Universal Camera Corp. v. NLRB (1951) - Court must consider ALJ's contrary ruling when reviewing agency ruling.
 Richardson v. Perales (1971) - agency may rely on hearsay evidence over non-hearsay evidence and still meet the "substantial evidence" requirement for proving a fact.
 Citizens to Preserve Overton Park v. Volpe (1971) - Important case applying the "arbitrary and capricious" review to rule-making.
 Motor Vehicles Manufacturers Association v. State Farm (1983) - "arbitrary and capricious" to change rule without considering other options for the change.
 Chevron U.S.A., Inc. v. Natural Resources Defense Council, Inc. (1984) - What level of deference should an agency's interpretation of its own statute receive in areas where such interpretations were intended by Congress to have the "force of law"?
 Block v. Community Nutrition Institute (1984) - presumption of court reviewability overcome when statutory scheme indicates no congressional intent to create a private right.
 Bowen v. Michigan Academy of Family Physicians (1986) - Statutory presumption of reviewability not overcome.
 Webster v. Doe (1988) - may not review agency action where "no law to apply."
 Martin v. Occupational Safety and Health Review Commission (1991) - When adjudication and rule-making power is split between two agencies, court should defer to rule-making agency's interpretations.
 Auer v. Robbins (1997) - How much deference should an agency interpretation of its own regulations get?
 United States v. Mead Corp. (2001) - What level of deference should an agency's interpretation receive when not intended to have the "force of law"?  How to decide if Congress intended to have the "force of law"?
 Norton v. S. Utah Wilderness Alliance (2004) - Under APA, court can only force the agency to act when it has failed to act when the required act is non-discretionary in nature.

Limits on Agency Power 
Statutory Interpretation
 FDA v. Brown & Williamson Tobacco Corp. (2000) - Existence and scope of authority to rule-make (applying Chevron).
Bowen v. Georgetown University Hospital (1988) - whether retroactive rulemaking is permitted

The Administrative Procedure Act (APA)
 United States v. Florida East Coast Railway Co. (1973) - formal rule-making requires statute that requires "hearing on the record."
 Vermont Yankee Nuclear Power Corp. v. Natural Resources Defense Council, Inc. (1978) - courts may not impose additional procedural requirements on top of the APA in rule-making.
 Pension Benefit Guaranty Corporation v. LTV Corporation (1990) - informal adjudication must meet the requirements of APA sec. 555.

Procedural Due Process
 Londoner v. City and County of Denver (1908) - Due process requirements for adjudication (Cf. Bi-Metallic)
 Bi-Metallic Investment Co. v. State Board of Equalization (1915) - Due process requirements for rule-making.
 Goldberg v. Kelly (1970) - When does state or federal law create rights protected by due process?
 Mathews v. Eldridge (1976) - What level of procedural due process is required?
 Logan v. Zimmerman Brush Co. (1982) – Does an adjudicating agency's termination of an action due to its own failure to comply with the law deny due process to the complainant?

Limits on Power to Make Policy Through Adjudication
 SEC v. Chenery Corp. (1947) - Impermissible creation of retroactive "rules" through adjudication.
 U.S. v. Storer Broadcasting Co. (1956) - agency can make regulations particularizing statute in order to bar some claims at the threshold.
 NLRB v. Wyman-Gordon Co. (1969) - making "rules" through adjudication.
 NLRB v. Bell-Aerospace Co. (1974) - can make "rules" through adjudication as long as not abuse of discretion.

See also 
 United States administrative law

References 

United States administrative case law
Administrative Law